Future Park may refer to:
 Future Park Rangsit, a shopping mall in Pathum Thani, Thailand.
 Future Park Bang Khae, a shopping mall in Bangkok, Thailand; now under-renovation and changed name to Seacon Bangkae.
 Jamuna Future Park, an under-construction shopping mall in Bangladesh.